BC Arsenal Tula is a basketball club based in Tula, Russia. The club currently plays in the Russian Super League 2, the third tier in Russia.

History
The club was founded in 1997 as BK Arsenal and used the licence of CSK VSS Samara. In its debut season, the club ended in third place in the Russian Super League A. 

The club was also in financial trouble in all its Super League years. In the 2004–05 season, Arsenal finally withdrew from the top division.

Honours
Super League A
Third place (1): 1998–99
Super League B
Winners (1): 2000–01

Notable players

 Alexander Petrenko

References

Arsenal